Order of Saint Catherine may refer to:
 Order of Saint Catherine, awarded to women by Imperial Russia, 1714–1917
 Order of Saint Catherine the Great Martyr, awarded by the Russian Federation since 2012
 Order of Saint Catherine of Mount Sinai, purportedly awarded by the House of Lusignan since 1063
 Order of Saint Catherine, founded by Humbert II of Viennois in the 1330s